San Bartolomeo al Mare is a comune (municipality) in the Province of Imperia in the Italian region Liguria, located about  southwest of Genoa and about  northeast of Imperia.

San Bartolomeo al Mare borders the following municipalities: Andora, Cervo, Diano Castello, Diano Marina, Diano San Pietro, and Villa Faraldi.

See also
 Steria

References

External links
 Official website

Cities and towns in Liguria
Populated coastal places in Italy